Alfonso Humberto Robles Cota (October 30, 1931 – January 5, 2017) was a Roman Catholic bishop.

Ordained to the priesthood in 1955, Robles Cota served as bishop of the Roman Catholic Diocese of Tepic, Mexico, from 1981 to 2008.

Robles Cota died in Guadalajara, Mexico on January 5, 2017.

References

1931 births
2017 deaths
20th-century Roman Catholic bishops in Mexico
21st-century Roman Catholic bishops in Mexico